IRIB Bazaar (Market channel, Shibkâh-e Bazâr) was a national home shopping TV channel in Iran which was launched on November 20, 2011 and was the third Iranian television channel to broadcast in digital mode.  This channel was available in most provinces and could be received using Set-top box devices, or Satellite televisions. The channel closed on 17 March 2016 and merged in IRIB TV5.

Targets
This channel had 7 main purposes. Including the following:

Economical news
Educational programs about trading
Advertisement

However it couldn't reach the targets and was one of the most unsuccessful channels in IRIB.

See also 
 Islamic Republic of Iran Broadcasting

References

External links

Islamic Republic of Iran Broadcasting
Television stations in Iran
Persian-language television stations
Television channels and stations established in 2011
Shopping networks
Mass media in Tehran